The British Fourteenth Army was a multi-national force comprising units from Commonwealth countries during the Second World War. As well as British Army units, many of its units were from the Indian Army and there were also significant contributions from British Army's West and East African divisions. It was often referred to as the "Forgotten Army" because its operations in the Burma Campaign were overlooked by the contemporary press, and remained more obscure than those of the corresponding formations in Europe for long after the war. For most of the Army's existence, it was commanded by Lieutenant-General William Slim.

History

Creation
The army was formed in 1943 in eastern India. At least two sources report the story of Lord Louis Mountbatten's first or one of his initial meetings with Lieutenant General William Slim, then General Officer Commanding XV Corps. Slim reportedly told Mountbatten "..Let's change this ghastly name Eastern Army. Let's just get a number."

With the creation of South East Asia Command in late 1943, the Eastern Army which formerly controlled operations against the Japanese Army in Burma and also had large rear-area responsibilities, was split into two. Eastern Command (reporting to GHQ India) took over the rear areas of Bihar, Odisha and most of Bengal. Fourteenth Army, part of the British 11th Army Group, became responsible for operations against the Japanese.

The Army's commander was Lieutenant-General William Slim. Its principal subordinate formations were IV Corps in Assam and XV Corps in Arakan. During the early part of 1944, the Army also had loose operational control over the American and Chinese Northern Combat Area Command, and the Chindits operating behind enemy lines under Major General Orde Wingate.

Defending British India
In early 1944, the Allies began tentative advances into Burma. The Japanese responded with all-out offensives, intending to destroy the Allies in their base areas.

The first Japanese move was a subsidiary attack in Arakan where XV Corps was advancing slowly south. After initial Allied setbacks, in which an Indian divisional HQ was overrun, the surrounded units defeated the Japanese at the Battle of the Admin Box. A vital factor was the resupply of cut-off units by aircraft.

The main Japanese offensive was launched on the central front in Assam. While a division advanced to Kohima to isolate IV Corps, the main body attempted to surround and destroy IV Corps at Imphal. Since the Japanese attack in Arakan had already failed, battle hardened units were flown from Arakan to aid the besieged forces in Assam. Also, XXXIII Corps was moved from southern India, where they had been training for amphibious operations, to relieve the garrison at Kohima and then push on to relieve Imphal.

The result of the battles was a crushing Japanese defeat. The Japanese suffered 85,000 casualties, mainly from sickness and disease after their supplies ran out. The Allies had been continually supplied from the air, in the largest operation of its type to that date.

Retaking Burma
In 1945, amphibious operations to recapture Burma had to be cancelled once again because of shortage of resources. Instead, Fourteenth Army was to mount the main offensive. The Army was now subordinated to the headquarters of Allied Land Forces, South East Asia (ALFSEA), and consisted of IV Corps and XXXIII Corps. Since the Army's supply lines by land were long and precarious, air supply was once again to be vital.

The Japanese attempted to forestall the Allied attacks by withdrawing behind the Irrawaddy River. Fourteenth Army was nevertheless able to change its axis of advance. IV Corps, spearheaded by armoured and motorised units, crossed the river downstream of the main Japanese forces and seized the vital logistic and communications centre of Meiktila. As the Japanese attempted to recapture Meiktila, XXXIII Corps captured Mandalay, the former capital which was of major significance to the majority Burman population. The result of the Battles of Meiktila and Mandalay, known as the Battle of Central Burma, was the destruction of most of the Japanese units in Burma, which allowed the subsequent pursuit.

Fourteenth Army now advanced south. While XXXIII Corps advanced down the Irrawaddy River, IV Corps made the main effort along the Sittang River, covering  in a month. It was vital to capture Rangoon, the capital and principal port of Burma, to allow the Army to be supplied during the monsoon.

The Fourteenth Army was supported by the Women's Auxiliary Service (Burma) who provided a canteen service for the troops of Burma Command and moved down through the country with the Army.

End of the War
Shortly after the fall of Rangoon, the Army headquarters was relieved of responsibility for operations in Burma. A new Twelfth Army headquarters was formed from XXXIII Corps HQ and took over IV Corps. Fourteenth Army HQ now moved to Ceylon to plan operations to recapture Malaya and Singapore. It controlled XV Corps and the newly raised Indian XXXIV Corps.

General Slim was promoted to command Allied Land Forces South East Asia. Lieutenant-General Miles Dempsey was appointed to command Fourteenth Army.

A seaborne landing on the west coast of Malaya, codenamed Operation Zipper, was being prepared but was forestalled by the dropping of the atomic bombs on Hiroshima and Nagasaki and the Japanese surrender. Zipper was nevertheless mounted unopposed as the quickest method of introducing troops to Malaya to enforce the surrender of the Japanese there and repatriate Allied prisoners of war.

Fourteenth Army was renamed Malaya Command on 1 November 1945.

Commonwealth Army
The Fourteenth Army, like the Eighth Army, was made up from units that came from all corners of the Commonwealth. In 1945 the Fourteenth Army was the largest army in the Commonwealth and one of the largest armies in the world, with about  a million men under command. Three African divisions, the 81st, 82nd West African Division and 11th (East Africa) Division were attached to the army. There were many units and formations from the British Army but the majority of the army was built around the British Indian Army, which was stated to be the largest all-volunteer army in history with 2,500,000 men.

Order of battle
The Fourteenth Army was the Second World War's largest Commonwealth Army, with nearly a million men by late 1944.

At different periods of the Second World War it was composed of four corps:
  IV Corps
  XV Corps
  XXXIII Corps
  XXXIV Corps

A total of thirteen divisions served with the Army:
  British 2nd Infantry Division
  Indian 5th Infantry Division
  Indian 7th Infantry Division
  11th (East Africa) Infantry Division
  Indian 17th Infantry Division
  Indian 19th Infantry Division
  Indian 20th Infantry Division
  Indian 23rd Infantry Division
  Indian 25th Infantry Division
  Indian 26th Infantry Division
  British 36th Infantry Division
  81st (West Africa) Infantry Division
  82nd (West Africa) Infantry Division

Some smaller fighting formations also served:
50th Parachute Brigade (India)
268 Indian Motor Brigade
Lushai Brigade
28 Infantry Brigade (East Africa)

Also serving with the 14th Army were a range of army, corps and divisional units not organic to the combat divisions.

Notes and memorials
When you go home don't worry about what to tell your loved ones and friends about service in Asia. No one will know where you were, or where it is if you do. You are, and will remain "The Forgotten Army." ― attributed to General Slim.

The War Cemetery in Kohima has the famous inscription "When You Go Home, Tell Them Of Us And Say, For Your Tomorrow, We Gave Our Today"—The Kohima Epitaph is attributed to John Maxwell Edmonds (1875–1958), and is thought to have been inspired by the epitaph of Simonides written by Simonides to honour the Spartans who fell at the Battle of Thermopylae in 480 BC.

Footnotes

Further reading
 Brian Aldiss, Forgotten Life (1988)
 Louis Allen, Burma: The Longest War, 1941–45, London: Weidenfeld and Nicolson, 2000.
 Christopher Bayly and Tim Harper, Forgotten Armies: Britain's Asian Empire and the War with Japan, UK: Penguin, 2005
 Bernard Fergusson, Beyond the Chindwin, 1962.
 George MacDonald Fraser. Quartered Safe Out Here: Recollections of the War in Burma. London: Harper Collins (1995). (Fraser, author of the series of The Flashman Papers historical novels, writes vividly of his service in the Burma campaigns of 1944–45, and of the soldiers he served with.)
 Michael Hickey, The Unforgettable Army: Slim's XIVth Army in Burma, Stroud: Spellmount, 1998.
 Jon Latimer, Burma: The Forgotten War, London: John Murray, 2004.
 Robert Lyman, Slim, Master of War, London: Constable and Robinson, 2004.
 William Slim, Defeat into Victory, London: Cassell, 1956.
 Julian Thompson, The Imperial War Museum Book of the War in Burma 1942–1945, London: Pan Macmillan, 2003.
James Howard Williams (Elephant Bill), was Elephant Advisor to the Fourteenth Army, see his Elephant Bill (1950) and Bandoola (1953)
John Masters. The Road Past Mandalay''

Documentaries
 Burma: The Forgotten War, BBC, 1995 (Director: Mark Fielder; Narrator: Charles Wheeler)
Captain Tom's War, ITV, 2020 (Captain Tom Moore marks 75 years since VJ Day and the end of World War Two)

Military units and formations established in 1943
Military units and formations disestablished in 1945
14
14
Military units and formations of the British Empire in World War II